Greater Than Love is a 1921 American silent drama film directed by Fred Niblo. An incomplete print of the film exists in the Library of Congress.

Cast
 Louise Glaum as Grace Merrill
 Patricia Palmer as Elsie Brown
 Rose Cade as Maizie
 Eve Southern as Clairice
 Willie Mae Carson as Pinkie
 Betty Francisco as Helen Wellington
 Mahlon Hamilton as Bruce Wellington
 Donald MacDonald as Elliott
 Edward Martindel as Frank Norwood
 Gertrude Claire as "Mother" Brown

References

External links

Film stills at silenthollywood.com

1921 films
1921 drama films
Silent American drama films
American silent feature films
American black-and-white films
Films directed by Fred Niblo
1920s American films